Montague William Hayter (16 November 1871 – 6 May 1948) was an English first-class cricketer. A right-handed batsman, he represented Hampshire in seven first-class matches in 1904, making his debut against Leicestershire. His final first-class appearance for Hampshire came against Leicestershire in August 1904. Hayter scored 166 runs at an average of 13.83 with a highest score of 82. The 1904 County Championship season was Hayter's only season in first-class cricket.

Hayter died in Christchurch, Hampshire on 6 May 1948.

External links
Montague Hayter at Cricinfo
Montague Hayter at CricketArchive

1871 births
1948 deaths
People from Ringwood, Hampshire
English cricketers
Hampshire cricketers